Manzano Peak is the highest peak in the Manzano Mountains, a mountain range in the central part of the US State of New Mexico.
The summit is below the tree line, but has views to the east, south, and west.

Manzano Peak can be accessed via trail number 80 (the Kayser Trail), leading to the Crest Trail (number 170), from a trailhead on the east side of the range.

References

External links 
 
 
 

Mountains of New Mexico
Landforms of Torrance County, New Mexico
Mountains of Torrance County, New Mexico